Ian Nicholas Lovett (born 6 September 1944) is an English banker.

Ian Lovett is a former Chairman of Dunbar Bank. He has also held directorships of Barclays Bank, Zurich Financial Services and Openwork (2011-2021) and has made appearances as an after-dinner speaker.

He chaired Middlesex County Cricket Club (2007-2016) and was later Deputy Chairman (2015-2018) and President (2018-2021) of the England and Wales Cricket Board.

References

External links
 
 English Cricket Board 
 

1944 births
Living people
Chairmen of Middlesex County Cricket Club
English bankers